"Dweller on the Threshold" is a song written by Northern Irish singer-songwriter Van Morrison and first released on his 1982 album, Beautiful Vision. It was released as a single on the B-Side in 1982 with the instrumental "Scandinavia" as the "A" tune. Another release in 1984 had a live version of "Dweller on the Threshold" as the A-Side.

Recording and composition
The song was recorded for the album on the Beautiful Visions sessions in summer 1981 at the Record Plant Studios in Sausalito, California.

The album sleeve states that the lyrics on this song and part of "Aryan Mist" were inspired by the 1950 publication, Glamour —A World Problem by Alice Bailey and the Tibetan master, Djwal Khul, as described in Van Morrison's liner notes for the album. According to the teachings of Bailey, there are a series of what she calls "glamours" which are mental illusions creating a fog that veils the spiritual wanderer from seeing the world as it truly is. He becomes illuminated as a "dweller on the threshold" when the "Angel of Presence" purifies the soul with light. This song was co-written with Morrison's engineer Hugh Murphy.

Other releases
A live version of this song was performed on the Live at the Grand Opera House Belfast album recorded when Morrison appeared in concert on 11 and 12 March in 1983. "Dweller on the Threshold" was one of the hit songs that was featured on Morrison's first ever "Best of" albums, The Best of Van Morrison that was released by Polydor in 1990. It is one of the songs remastered and included on Morrison's third compilation album for 2007, Still on Top - The Greatest Hits.  It is featured on both the two disc set released in the UK on 22 October 2007, and also is one of the twenty-one hits on the single disc released on 6 November 2007, in the US and Canada.

Personnel
Van Morrison –  vocals 
Tom Donlinger – drums
Pee Wee Ellis – tenor saxophone
Chris Hayes – guitar
David Hayes – bass guitar
Mark Isham – trumpet
Pauline Lozano – backing vocals
Chris Michie – guitar 
Annie Stocking – backing vocals
Bianca Thornton – backing vocals

Notes

References
Nevill Drury (1985). Music for Inner Space, Prism Press 
Heylin, Clinton (2003), Can You Feel the Silence? Van Morrison: A New Biography, London: Viking,  
Rogan, Johnny (2006). Van Morrison: No Surrender, London:Vintage Books 

1982 songs
Van Morrison songs
Songs written by Van Morrison
Song recordings produced by Van Morrison